Josiah William Bailey (September 14, 1873 – December 15, 1946) was an American politician who served as a U.S. senator from the state of North Carolina from 1931 to 1946.

Early life and education
Born in Warrenton, North Carolina, he grew up in Raleigh and graduated from Wake Forest College (now Wake Forest University).

Career 
Before turning to a career in law, Bailey was editor of the Biblical Recorder, a newspaper for North Carolina Baptists. He was a presidential elector in 1908.

Elected to the United States Senate in 1930, defeating longtime incumbent Furnifold McLendel Simmons, Bailey earned a reputation as a conservative while in office. In 1937, he coauthored the bipartisan Conservative Manifesto, a document criticizing President Franklin Roosevelt's New Deal and proposing more conservative alternatives. Among other things, the Manifesto called for lower taxes and less spending. 

That same year, Bailey gave a rousing floor speech against President Roosevelt's court-packing bill, which convinced at least three freshman Republicans, thought by Majority Leader Joe Robinson to be definite supporters, to oppose the measure.

A segregationist and white supremacist, Bailey filibustered anti-lynching legislation in 1938.

During his time in office, he served as chairman of the Committee on Claims and Committee on Commerce.

Death 
Bailey died in office in 1946.

See also
 List of United States Congress members who died in office (1900–49)

References

Sources 
Finley, Keith M. Delaying the Dream: Southern Senators and the Fight Against Civil Rights, 1938–1965 (Baton Rouge, LSU Press, 2008).

Further reading 
Moore, John Robert. Senator Josiah William Bailey of North Carolina: A Political Biography. Durham: Duke University Press, 1968.

External links

The "Conservative Manifesto" from the North Carolina History Project

"Taking on FDR: Senator Josiah Bailey and the 1937 Conservative Manifesto" by Troy Kickler, December 13, 2006
Raleigh News & Observer Column on Bailey's Friendship with Huey Long 
Josiah William Bailey at Find-A-Grave
Josiah Bailey papers. 1773–1867. 2" linear. At the University of Washington Libraries, Special Collections.

1873 births
1946 deaths
Democratic Party United States senators from North Carolina
North Carolina Democrats
Burials at Historic Oakwood Cemetery
Wake Forest University alumni
Baptists from North Carolina
Old Right (United States)
American white supremacists
1908 United States presidential electors